Magalí Benítez (born 9 December 1975) is a former professional tennis player from Paraguay.

Benítez won the Coffee Bowl junior tournament in 1993 and was a junior doubles quarterfinalist at the 1993 Wimbledon Championships. She went on to compete on the professional tour, reaching a best singles ranking of 350 in the world.

From 1993 to 1995, Benítez featured in a total 14 Fed Cup ties for Paraguay, finishing with a 13–6 overall record, with four singles wins and nine victories in doubles.

ITF finals

Singles: 6 (1–5)

Doubles: 5 (2–3)

References

External links
 
 
 

1975 births
Living people
Paraguayan female tennis players
20th-century Paraguayan women